Pinoy Big Brother: Connect is the ninth main and fifteenth season of Pinoy Big Brother which premiered on December 6, 2020, on both A2Z and Kapamilya Channel. The show was also simulcast and digitally streamed via ABS-CBN's entertainment website, iWantTFC (on-demand streaming service) and Kapamilya Channel's Kapamilya Online Live in Facebook and YouTube; live feeds of the House were also shown on Kumu, an online streaming platform. With the blocktime arrangement inked between ABS-CBN and TV5, the show aired on free television broadcast from March 8 until its finale.

Toni Gonzaga, Bianca Gonzalez, and Robi Domingo reprised their roles as hosts. Meanwhile, new digital hosts joined the show: Richard Juan was the host for the show's online updates; while Enchong Dee and Melai Cantiveros were the hosts for the show's online companion programs across various online platforms. Kim Chiu, Edward Barber, and Maymay Entrata were earlier reported to host online contents for the program (with Chiu and Entrata having joined the official launch and the Big Night respectively, while Barber only appeared on the Big Night, acting for the Comedy sketch as one of the housemates), but were never seen doing their hosting stints in the succeeding events of the show; Dee and Cantiveros, on the other hand, were occasionally seen to host the afternoon online companion show.

This was the first season where the show was not being aired on ABS-CBN after the said network was ordered by the National Telecommunications Commission (NTC) to cease and desist its free-to-air television and radio broadcast operations on May 5, 2020, following the lapse of its congressional franchise. The network also failed to secure a renewal of its congressional franchise after its renewal bid was rejected by the House of Representatives on July 10, 2020.

Also before the show's grand finale, this was the first time and season that to be aired on TV5 due to ABS-CBN's legislative franchise renewal issue and to the partnership agreement of the two networks. Spanned beginning March 8 until March 13 (which is the finale week), and March 14, 2021 (which is the Big Night).

This was the fifth consecutive time that both civilian adults and teenagers participated in one season, and the first time since the All In season to house them together as just one batch. Among all regular and special seasons, this season was the season with the shortest number of days (99) of which a group of housemates representing an entire season have stayed in the House.

The show concluded on March 14, 2021, with Liofer Pinatacan declared as the Big Winner.

Development
With the scrapping of the television broadcast operations of ABS-CBN by the NTC on May 5, 2020, the continuity of the local Big Brother franchise was left uncertain. This is because of the Philippine senators and congressmen who voted YES to shut down ABS-CBN's operations. No news or information were provided by the network nor by the production team behind the show of the fate of the said franchise. However, on October 16, 2020, Pinoy Big Brother hinted an announcement for a possible return of the show. On the 18th of October in 2020, on ASAP Natin 'To!, it was officially announced that a new season will air and the said season will be called Pinoy Big Brother: Connect. No physical auditions will be held; instead all auditions will be done online.

ABS-CBN's Television Production Head Unit and the Head Director of the Pinoy Big Brother franchise, Direk Lauren Diyogi, revealed in an interview of an episode of TV Patrol that Pinoy Big Brother: Connect will push through in November 2020, although the exact date was not mentioned. However, it was later confirmed that Pinoy Big Brother: Connect will begin on December 6, 2020. Dyogi also revealed that the ninth season to take place at the current situation of the network and of the country was unplanned, and that it had only prospered after the show had partnered with Kumu.

The number of housemates that will take part in this season was initially lowered to 12, making this season with the fewest housemates in Pinoy Big Brother history, surpassing the first regular season of Pinoy Big Brother, the season that had only 13 housemates. However, it was later confirmed via online PBB: KUMUlitan show with Robi Domingo and Lie Reposposa that 18 aspiring housemates will be taking part this season.

Auditions
Pinoy Big Brother: Connect was first revealed during the October 18, 2020 episode of ASAP Natin 'To!, along with new audition mechanics for this newest season. Owing to the ongoing COVID-19 pandemic in the Philippines, the auditions and its program were held using Kumu, a Filipino online streaming platform. Auditions were opened for ages 16 to 35 years-old. The auditions were opened on October 19, 2020; it ended on November 11, 2020.

For an aspiring housemate to join Pinoy Big Brother: Connect, they must create a Kumu account and record a 1-minute video wherein they will be introducing themselves and why they want to join Pinoy Big Brother. Afterwards, they were required to upload it on Kumu and use the hashtag #PBBkumuaudition; a maximum of one entry per account. If an auditionee was accepted as one of the shortlisted hopefuls, they will then receive a message from a PBB executive via Kumu. At the end of the online auditions via Kumu, a total of 177,524 audition entries were submitted for this season—the highest in the entire history of the franchise.

COVID-19 precautions
Pinoy Big Brother: Connect had some notable changes due to the ongoing COVID-19 pandemic in the Philippines. Prior to the premiere of Pinoy Big Brother: Connect on December 6, 2020, the Pinoy Big Brother house was thoroughly disinfected, the hosts, crew, and the housemates of the show also went onto a PCR testing, and social distancing was also being observed inside the house as the preventive measure from the ongoing COVID-19 pandemic. There is also no audience present on the premiere night of the show on December 6, 2020.

Timeslot
The show aired daily on Mondays to Fridays at 10:00 p.m. after Walang Hanggang Paalam, on Saturdays at 10:00 p.m. after Maalaala Mo Kaya, and on Sundays at 8:30 p.m. after Your Face Sounds Familiar. The show's companion show, Pinoy Big Brother: Kumunect Tayo, aired daily via Kumu, Facebook, and YouTube at 5:00 p.m. for its afternoon show, while it follows the main show's schedule for its evening show.

Also, in this season, evictions regularly occurred on Sundays, while the lists of nominees were usually revealed on Mondays or Tuesdays.

The show did not air on December 20, 2020, as it was pre-empted by ABS-CBN's Christmas Special.

Prizes
The winner of this season won a unit from PHirst Park Homes and a cash prize of 1 Million pesos only from Brilliant Skin Essentials. The second, third and fourth big placers received five hundred thousand pesos, three hundred thousand pesos and two hundred thousand pesos, respectively.

Format 
Each week, each participating housemate had to nominate two people for eviction with the first receiving two points and the second with one point. The housemates with the most votes (usually three) will then face the public vote with the nominee receiving the fewest votes (through a save to evict voting system) being evicted from the house. The format however may be altered as seen in Day 49 where the Co-HoHs directly nominated two nominees each and in Day 81 where the housemates ranked their housemates rather than the usual nomination process.

As a punishment or as a consequence, Big Brother can automatically nominate additional housemates if they had incurred violations or have failed a specific task. Big Brother can also give immunity to those who have succeeded in winning a challenge or a task. Sometimes, Big Brother can suspend the nomination process or moved the nominations to a later date in lieu of the result of a pending challenge or task.

Twists
 Partnership with KUMU
 KUMUnity Housemate Selection – The last three official housemates were chosen by the public out of the 117 hopefuls via the Kumu app. From December 6 to 27, these hopefuls were tasked to make livestream videos and had engagements with the public via Kumu. Those three hopefuls who received the most diamonds by the public during the said duration became the official housemates.
 In every weekly task, the housemates were given the privilege to do livestreams in order to earn diamonds; these diamonds were used to buy materials for the tasks or to buy practice time for their routines, to name a few.
 Kumu users were given more percentage in the vote-to-evict or vote-to-save system: they were given a weight of 70% in the total votes compared with the 30% weight of votes coming from SMS. This set-up was later altered to 1 Kumu vote was equivalent to 10 SMS votes.
 Kumu users, through public poll within the app, were sometimes given the privilege to suggest punishments for the housemates as a consequence for the violations they have incurred. They were also given the opportunity to decide on several things, such as: whether to increase the items needed in a task or challenge, to increase the difficulty of a task or challenge, or in how will Big Brother announce new twists to the housemates.
 Padaluck – Last used in the Lucky 7 season, the Kumu users had the chance to give an advantage to a housemate. The advantage was given to the housemate who had received the most "padalucks" through Kumu's livestream gifting system. This twist was also used in the fourth and succeeding Heads on Household challenges.
 Kumu Houseguests – Kumu users compete and win via Kumu for two slots as houseguests; as houseguests, they stayed in the House and joined the housemates in their weekly task for a certain number of days.
 Heads of Household – Last used in Unlimited, those who earned the title were granted immunity from being nominated in the upcoming nomination week.
 Instant Nominations during the Launch Night – If the housemates failed to finish their first task during the launch night, three of them will be nominated instantly.
 Isolation Area – During the launch night and after finishing their first task, the Heads of Households named three housemates who stayed and lived in an isolation area. They were not allowed to cross the demarcated line unless when allowed by Big Brother. The only way for them to join the other housemates was to successfully finish Big Brother's secret tasks.
 Vote-to-Save or Vote-to-Evict System – Last used in the 737 season, the public were allowed to vote for the housemate they want to save or evict.
 Supercharged Challenges – For the fifth Heads of Household challenges, other housemates challenged the holders of the HoH titles. At the end of the challenges, the two housemates who won were immune for two consecutive weeks.
 Supercharged Power – The two Heads of Household housemates who earned their titles during the Supercharged Challenges were given the power to exclusively nominate the other housemates for eviction.
 Power of Veto – The Heads of Household had the power to remove a housemate in the list of nominees for eviction.
 This power was also used after the two weeks of Supercharged Challenges. The power was given to a group of housemates who won a competition; this power was a collective power and that the housemate that got the most votes from the members of this group receives the power of veto medallion and is saved automatically from the nominations.
 Delika-Dos – The performance of the housemates in a challenge determined if one or two housemates will be evicted during the sixth eviction night.
 Rank-based Nomination – Instead of nominating two housemates for eviction, the housemates ranked all the remaining housemates—including themselves— from the most favored to the least favored to be included in the Big 4. The most favored received the fewest point (for ranked 1st, 1 point); the least favored received the most points (the last in rank, 8 points). This twist was last used in Lucky 7 season.
 Big 4 Karapatdapat Challenges – For the second to the last week of the season, and in order to determine the four finalists, all housemates participated in a series of challenges to determine their respective Big 4 slots. But unlike in all previous seasons, winning one challenge did not automatically guaranteed a housemate's slot for the Big 4. Winners of a challenge may have to defend their position in the last two Challenger challenges. This twist was the first time in the franchise's history that all Big 4 slots were determined by a series of challenges as previous seasons usually determined their Big 4 via a mix of public voting and use of challenges. This twist was similar to the concept of the Supercharged Challenges Heads of Household twist.

Overview

Logo
The logo for Pinoy Big Brother: Connect still used its graphical eye, (first introduced in the previous season) in which the eye features motifs inspired by and colors taken from the Philippine flag. The outline of the house which was used before in the logo of Pinoy Big Brother: Otso was later removed. The colors of the text were also changed from the previous navy blue color now with a slightly lighter blue. The color of the season text in the logo was emphasized with a bright yellow and an orange gradient.

House
The Pinoy Big Brother house was refurnished with new furniture in the living room, the bedroom, and the dining area. There were no major changes in the house interior, which still follows the original layour used in Pinoy Big Brother: Otso. The house façade was decorated with Christmas decorations due to Christmas already drawing near at the start of the season.

Theme song
This season's theme song is "Connected Na Tayo" performed and written by Otso ex-housemates Jem Macatuno, Shawntel Cruz, Lie Reposposa and Kiara Takahashi where, just like the preceding season's theme song "Otso Na!", most elements (including the chorus) from Orange and Lemons's "Pinoy Ako," the franchise's theme song, were included in the song.

The season's eviction theme song was performed, written, and produced by Jem Macatuno entitled "Bagong Simula." Both songs are included in the album "Connected Na Tayo (Ang Soundtrack Ng Bahay Mo Vol. 2)".

Housemates
A week prior to the entry of the first 12 housemates, the identities of two housemates were revealed daily via It's Showtime! and TV Patrol. Officially, the first 12 housemates entered during the premiere night of the show on December 6, 2020. Among them, 6 were adults, while the remaining 6 were teenagers.

It was later announced that 6 more housemates will soon be introduced in the upcoming episodes after accomplishing their mandatory 14-day quarantine. Three of the additional housemates were already pre-selected and were completing their own isolation periods before their entry, including one from France whose travel to the Philippines in order to compete was facilitated by the production staff. The other three were selected via Kumu; they vied among 117 hopefuls in various series of livestream challenges in three different stages. The selection process began on December 6 and ended on December 26. As of January 24, 2021, the three new housemates have already entered the House, after completing the required health clearances, including mandatory quarantine, psychological test, and COVID-19 test.

 Liofer Pinatacan: Known as the "Dong Diskarte of Zamboanga del Sur", he was an industrious and resourceful housemate who was great in tasks and was never nominated, despite getting into hot water with Justin for allegedly making fun of the time where the housemate shared stories about their fathers
 Andrea Abaya: Called the "Cheerdance Sweetheart of Parañaque", she initially garnered comparisons to Pinoy Big Brother: Otso fan favorite Ashley del Mundo. In the house, she was a core member of the Council, and thus was never nominated, as her only nomination ended up getting vetoed. She also had a romantic relationship with Kobie
 Kobie Brown: Billed the "Charming Striker ng Parañaque" owing to his football background, he immediately became close friends with fellow footballer Chico and formed a tight bond with Andrea in the middle part of the edition. He was also notable for crying hysterically on two occasions.
 Jie-Ann Armero: Called the "Kwelang Fangirl of Sarangani" and a member of the Council, she was initially popular with viewers, especially due to a scene where Justin allegedly made fun of her hygiene. However, her popularity declined during the latter part of the season due to her immaturity, laziness, and favoritism allegations, especially with her punishment for committing 10 violations being too lax, whereas housemates from prior seasons got more severe punishments for less.
 Chico Alicaya: Known as the "Striving Footballer of Cebu", he immediately formed a close bond with Kobie due to their similar interests. While he was mildly popular with the viewers for the first half of the edition, he became unpopular due to a conversation with Amanda where he body-shamed Alyssa
 Ella Cayabyab: Known as the "Ra-Kweentera of Quezon", she was very popular with viewers as she was usually ostracized by the Council in the latter half of the edition, which began when she was accused by Andrea of being "bossy" in a practice for their Jumprope task, and intensified with her involvement in the Kobie-Andrea storyline
 Aizyl Tandugon: Dubbed the "Miss Malakas of Misamis Oriental", she was the initial target of the Council as she was nominated every single week until her eviction, with the exception of the third nomination where she won immunity. She became close friends with Ella, who also became a target of the Council later on, despite an early misunderstanding over a moisturizer
 Haira Palaguitto: Called the "Makatang Marikit ng Pangasinan" ("Beautiful Poet of Pangasinan"), she was notable for her friendship with Kyron and her trustfulness of Alyssa which lead to her eviction
 Russu Laurente: Called the "Bunsong Boksingero of General Santos City", his PBB tenure was notable for an argument with Aizyl after she told him that "masyado kang nagmagaling" ("You show off too much"), and for admitting that he initially supported the shutdown of ABS-CBN
Notes

  Glenda Victorio of Rizal was initially confirmed as one of three housemates from Kumu's public selection, but she withdrew due to personal reasons. Quincy Villanueva of Laguna (the runner-up in Victorio's group) replaced her.
  Banawis entered the House on Day 49. However, since Day 44, she was already allowed to interact all day with Housemates and also joined their weekly task virtually.

Housemate selection via Kumu
The final three housemates were selected via Kumu. 117 hopefuls competed in various series of livestream challenges in three different stages. The 9 remaining hopefuls were then divided in groups based on their traits, namely Matatag (Steadfast), Madiskarte (Resourceful), and Malakas ang Loob (Courageous). Each group competed in different weeks. The Top diamond earners in each group will become the last three housemates to enter the house for the season.

Amanda Zamora, Gail Banawis and Glenda Victorio were initially reported to be the winners of the campaign. However, due to Victorio withdrawing in her sequester, she was replaced by Quincy Villanueva, the runner-up in her team.

Note

  At the time of the campaign.

Houseguests
Unlike those in previous seasons where houseguests normally visit the House, most of the houseguests for this season participated via video conferencing only. Sometimes, they were ordered by Big Brother to do some tasks, such as: to help, to coach, or to judge various tasks or challenges of the housemates.

Online or virtual guesting
 Coach Anne Jeline Salandanan contacted the house to coach the housemates for their weekly task and to judge their performances alongside Kim Chiu.
 Fifth Pagotan contacted the housemates, specifically the task leaders to give them advice for their Pinoy Big Digital Film weekly task with Enchong Dee as an acting consultant. Director Ted Boborol, Edward Barber and Maymay Entrata contacted the house to judge the housemates' film for the weekly task.
 Nene Tamayo and Slater Young contacted the house to mentor and judge the 3 bosses and to eliminate 1 group for the 3 bosses task.
 Yamyam Gucong and Fumiya Sankai contacted the house as visitors during the P-pop Week weekly task for an undisclosed reason.

Physical guesting
 Mickey Perz, Anna Graham and Jerwin Nicomedez entered the house with Perz coaching the housemates with choreography, Graham with the females' vocals, and Nicomendez with the males' vocals for their P-pop week weekly tasks, in addition, Perz also coached the housemates virtually for a certain period of time. BINI and BGYO also visited the House.
 Kumu houseguest winners Christian Bahaya and Russco Jarviña, and Top 9 Kumu shortlisted aspiring housemates Dale Patrick Chua and Glenda Victorio entered as special houseguests who served as Big Brother's assistants in one of the Big Jump challenges.

Tasks

Weekly tasks
As part of every season, weekly tasks are given in order for the housemates to earn their weekly groceries. However, as part of this season's twist, the housemates are allowed to do Kumu livestreams so that viewers can help with their weekly tasks. The diamonds (in-app gifting currency) they will earn from livestreaming can be used to purchase supplies for their tasks or to pay for minutes to practice their routines, to name a few.

Notes

  The housemates received only 50% of their budget after Ella's team committed 6 mistakes, which was their maximum number of allowable mistakes. The other 50% was forfeited after Haira's team committed 10 mistakes, which was more than their 3 allowable mistakes.
  The housemates can earn 1% for every 500 thousand diamonds. However, they earned only 10%, equivalent to 5 million diamonds. To reach the average of 80%, they would have needed at least 46%, equivalent to 23 million diamonds.
  Despite failing to win their weekly task, Big Brother still gave 71% of their weekly budget as a reward for their efforts for the weekly task.

Other tasks
Aside from the weekly tasks, the housemates were also given other significant tasks. These tasks usually involve rewards for someone special, some may include nomination or eviction twists as a consequence of failing such tasks, some were required to be done secretly, some may involve a combination of two or more types of tasks, or very difficult punishments.

Challenges

Heads of Household
Every week, each of the Housemates will undergo challenges to become one of the two Heads of Household. Becoming a Head of Household will earn them immunity from being nominated in that particular week.

For the fourth Heads of Household challenge, the Padaluck twist was implemented. It gave an advantage to a housemate who had received the most Kumu gifts.

Ligtask
The Ligtask challenge, carried over from previous seasons, were usually held in lieu of the Heads of Household challenge.

Before the Ligtask challenge, the public has a chance (via Kumu) to give an advantage to a housemate. The advantage will be given to the housemate who has received the most "padalucks" (done through Kumu's livestream gifting system). At the end of the challenge, the winner will be saved from becoming one of the nominees.

Big Jump
To determine this season's Big 4, all housemates participated in a series of challenges that was quite different from the Big Jump of the other previous seasons. All Big 4 slots were determined by all of these challenges—a deviation from the other seasons' Big Jump twist where the public's vote also played as a determining factor in choosing the final four. The series of challenges were called Big 4 Karapatdapat Challenges (Big 4 Worthy Challenges) and tested the housemates qualities: their self-trust, sense of camaraderie, resourcefulness and being steadfast.

Also as part of the twist, winning any of the Big 4 slot did not automatically guarantee their place for the Big Night as the winning housemates had to defend their spots against the two challengers chosen by the public to challenge them and take their positions.

Challengers
There were four Big 4 Karapatdapat Challenges that were played by the seven remaining housemates, each of which determined a holder for a certain Big 4 spot. Unknown to all of them, with four housemates taking the Big 4 spots, the three others who failed to take any of those spots were automatically nominated and had to face the public vote. The two housemates with the highest number of public votes were given a chance to stay and challenge the Big 4 while the housemate with the least vote was evicted.

As challengers, with their identity being hidden to the Big 4, they were required to challenge two housemates. In order for them to win and take any of the Big 4 slots, they must choose and defeat two of the current Big 4 occupants. Failure would mean automatic eviction.

The challenger challenges given by Big Brother were a combination of previous challenges the housemates had participated throughout this season and were exclusively chosen by the public via Kumu.

Amanda and Ralph drew of lots to determine the order of who will they pick to challenge: Amanda got the 2nd and 4th picks while Ralph got the 1st and 3rd picks. Ralph chose Andrea first for the first pick and Kobie for the third pick; Amanda chose Jie-Ann for the second pick and Liofer for the fourth pick. Their identities were revealed prior to the challenge. Before they made themselves known to the housemates, Amanda is known as the white challenger, while Ralph is known as the black challenger.

Big 4 Tasks
During the final days of the season, Big Brother gave the finalists a task. Each task can grant either extra votes to save or the deduction and transfer of vote to evict.

Nomination History
Note that the production team of show does not tally the launch night as Day 1. For the purposes of uniformity with the other previous season articles, the launch night is marked as Day 1, not the day after it. The days reflected in this article were always numbered a day ahead compared to that as shown in the program.

Legend

Notes

  Kyron and Mika were given the Head of Household (HoH) titles after gaining the most Kumu diamonds in their respective Kumu livestreams (the livestreams were made prior to their entry to the House). The HoH titles were given to them prior to the entry of the 10 other housemates. In addition, the housemates were given a task wherein their failure would lead to an instant nomination of three housemates decided by the Heads of Household. However, the housemates can void the said instant nominations by succeeding in their task. The housemates succeeded in their task, which led to having no nominations.
  The nominations took place on Day 15 (December 20), but was announced the night after as the December 20 episode was preempted by ABS-CBN's Christmas Special.
  Ralph was exempted from the nominations for being a new entrant. He entered the House on Day 15, the day when the first nominations took place.
  As a consequence, the nominees were limited only to Haira's team (Aizyl, Crismar, Haira, Kobie, Mika, Ralph and Russu) after they failed to win the jump rope task challenge; Ella's team (Alyssa, Andrea, Chico, Ella, Jie-Ann, Kyron and Liofer) was immune from the nominations. Aizyl, however, was saved from the nominations after winning the Ligtask challenge.
  The nominations took place on Day 30 (January 4) and was done pre-recorded; it was aired on the next day (January 5).
  Amanda was exempted from the nominations for being a new entrant. She entered the House on Day 36 right after Mika got evicted.
  Quincy was exempted from the nominations for being a new entrant. She entered the House on Day 43. Gail, on the other hand, was introduced later in the week to the housemates; the housemates were virtually allowed to interact with her via a tablet. However, at that time, she has not yet entered the House as she was still finishing her quarantine after contracting COVID-19.
  Alyssa and Chico, who won the Heads of Household's Supercharged Challenges, were immune for two weeks.
  Alyssa and Chico were given the Supercharged Power for winning as the new Heads of Household. It gave them the power to exclusively nominate two housemates each for eviction for this particular week. The other housemates were ineligible to vote, but may be voted by Alyssa or Chico. If in any case, Chico had already chosen a specific housemate, Alyssa cannot nominate that particular housemate and instead must choose another. Housemates that were given automatic nomination by either of the two were given red flags in a face-to-face nomination.
  Gail was not exempted from the nominations despite being a new entrant. This was due to the fact that she already had a week of interaction with the housemates as a virtual housemate.
  As punishment, Jie-Ann received an additional two points from Big Brother for the nominations after she failed to get a mentor for her company during their weekly task; this was given to her before the nomination process had started.
  Andrea and Jie-Ann were saved from the nominations, after Alyssa saved Andrea and Chico saved Jie-Ann by exercising their new given power, the Power of Veto.
  Team Dreamer Connect (composed of Quincy as boss; with members: Amanda, Andrea, Chico, Ella, Jie-Ann, and Kobie) won in the last week's weekly task against Team Survibin (composed of Gail as boss; with members: Aizyl, Alyssa, Kyron, Liofer, and Ralph). As a result, the members of Team Dreamer Connect will be immune for the next nominations; while the nominees will be taken from the members of Team Survibin only.
  Alyssa won the Ligtask challenge, saving herself from being nominated; Liofer received the Power of veto medallion from Team Dreamer Connect, saving himself from the nominations. With only three housemates (Gail, Kyron and Ralph) left for nominations, there was no need for a nomination process; the last three not saved from the ligtask challenge and not given the power of veto medallion were immediately included in the final list of nominees.
  All housemates were automatically nominated as part of this week's twist; they can save themselves through a series of ligtask of challenges: the Game of Hearts Challenges. The following eviction was a double eviction.
  For the 10th nominations, the nominations were based on the ranking given by the housemates to each other (including each of themselves). The six housemates with the fewest points will be safe from the eviction, while the last 2 housemates will be part of the list of nominees. For the full detail of the result in this nominations, see Rank-based nomination result.
  All the Big 4 slots were determined via a series of challenges called Big 4 Karapatdapat Challenges. Andrea won the first challenge; Jie-Ann, the second; Liofer, the third; and Kobie, fourth.
  The three housemates who did not win any of the Big 4 Karapatdapat Challenges were automatically nominated; the two housemates who will be saved in this eviction round will be named "Challengers".
  The challengers named by the public will challenge two finalists of their choice in a challenge. The challengers are required to defeat both finalists that they challenge in order to steal a spot in the Big 4.

Power of Veto
The Power of Veto was a power given to the winner of certain tasks. The holder of the power is given the chance to automatically save a nominee of their choice from the list of nominees. If the power was given to a group, the group will decide which nominee gets vetoed via a collective vote.

Unlike its American counterpart, no replacement nominee was required to be named making the power controversial among viewers.

Legend

Notes

  Being the Heads of Household, Alyssa and Chico each have the power to veto. Thus, needing no collective vote for a veto.
  Quincy was exempted from the nomination process as she is still a new entrant.
  Amanda, Andrea, Chico, Ella, Jie-Ann, Kobie and Quincy (Team Dreamer Connect) won the last week's competition. Each may vote to veto among Gail, Kyron, Liofer and Ralph who they will save; the housemates with the most votes wins the power of veto medallion.

Rank-based nomination result
For the 10th nomination week, the list of nominees was based on the housemates' rankings. Each housemate will rank all remaining housemates, including themselves. Each rank will receive a specific number of points: the first will receive 1 point; the second with 2 points; and so on until the eighth with 8 points. The total points received by each housemate will determine the final ranking; the housemates in the first six ranks will be saved from becoming part of the final list of nominees, while the housemates who receive the most points will be in the last two ranks and will become the official nominees for the week.

The housemates did not know that their rankings were the basis of this week's nomination until Big Brother mentioned this to them before the announcement of the rankings.

Note that the underlined names in the table below were the rank of the housemates they gave to themselves.

S–E voting system result
The following is a summary of the results of the evictions nights that had used the S-E voting system. In this system, a voter may vote to evict or to save a nominee from eviction. The votes to save are then subtracted by the votes to evict which may result in a nominee receiving a negative number of votes as seen in the first, eighth, tenth and eleventh evictions, this also results in the percentages not adding up to one hundred.

The votes were taken from the combined SMS and Kumu votes.

In the second and the succeeding eviction nights, the detailed summary was replaced by a combined net results of both votes from Kumu and SMS without further detailing the results of each medium. The percentage of Kumu's votes being 70% and that of SMS votes comprising 30% of the total votes remained the same.

Big Night
For the first time in Pinoy Big Brother history, the finale of the season, dubbed as Pinoy Big Brother: Connect @ The Big Night, was held in front of the Pinoy Big Brother House with a virtual audience. The finale also featured several guests, including past Pinoy Big Brother winners such as Nene Tamayo of Season 1, Bea Saw of Season 2, Ruben Gonzaga of Celebrity Edition 2, Ejay Falcon of Teen Edition Plus, Slater Young of Unlimited, Daniel Matsunaga of All In, Jimboy Martin of 737 Teens and Yamyam Gucong of Otso and other former housemates.

At the end of the night, Liofer Pinatacan was declared as the winner of the season. Andrea Abaya was declared as second big placer, Kobie Brown as the third big placer, and Jie-Ann Armero as the fourth big placer.

Official soundtrack

Star Music together with ABS-CBN created an album for this season entitled Connected Na Tayo (Ang Soundtrack Ng Bahay Mo Vol. 2) and was released on January 29, 2021. Tracks in this album are mostly composed by Otso ex-housemates Lie Reposposa, Shawntel Cruz, Jem Macatuno, and Kiara Takahashi, which includes this season's theme song and carrier track "Connected Na Tayo" and eviction theme song "Bagong Simula".

Controversies and criticism

Just like in all other seasons, this season was not spared from controversies and criticism. One issue involves the rude behavior of one housemate towards another; another was the inclusion of two housemates who favored the shutdown of ABS-CBN; and a mechanic that was tagged as "unfair" by viewers.

References

External links
 Pinoy Big Brother Official website
 Pinoy Big Brother: Connect Official portal

Pinoy Big Brother seasons
2020 Philippine television seasons
2021 Philippine television seasons
Television series impacted by the COVID-19 pandemic